The  Orlando Predators season was the 22nd season for the franchise in the Arena Football League. The team was coached by Doug Plank and played their home games at Amway Center. Despite losing their first five games, the Predators recovered enough to qualify for the playoffs. However, they were eliminated by the Philadelphia Soul by a score of 59–55 in the conference semifinals.

Final roster

Standings

Schedule

Regular season
The Predators began the season on the road against the New Orleans VooDoo on March 24. Their first home game was on April 6 against the Philadelphia Soul. They closed the regular season against the VooDoo at home on July 27.

Playoffs

References

Orlando Predators
Orlando Predators seasons
2013 in sports in Florida
2010s in Orlando, Florida